Cyclone Yaku is an unusual low-pressure system in the far Southeastern Pacific that impacted Ecuador and northern Peru in early March 2023. It has been described by the Peruvian  (SENAMHI) as an "unorganised tropical cyclone" not seen since 1983 or 1998. In Peru, the system killed at least eight, affected 49,000 people and destroyed thousands of homes.

Meteorological history
On 7 March, SENAMHI reported an "unorganized tropical cyclone". SENAMHI researchers were able to identify the formation of the cyclone at the end of February, and also stated that the unusual phenomenon would remain in the Peruvian sea but would not affect any cities on the Peruvian and Ecuadorian coasts. They also reported that moderate to heavy rainfall would develop on the northern coast and highlands of Peru from 9 to 11 March and that the cyclone would not become a hurricane. The system was named "Cyclone Yaku", with the word "Yaku" coming from the Quechuan translation of "water".

On 10 March, the National Institute of Meteorology and Hydrology (INAMHI) in Ecuador reported that Yaku was moving away from Ecuador and would no longer have a direct impact on the country. In Peru, it was predicted that precipitation from the event would last through mid-March while precipitation from warm sea temperatures would occur into April.

Impact

Peru

Settlements along the desert coast of Peru often do not have drainage systems, and even small amounts of precipitation prove problematic for affected areas. Peru's capital city Lima is one of the most arid cities in the world, only receiving an average of 10 millimeters of precipitation annually. The cyclone happened during the widespread protests that had been occurring since the 2022 Peruvian political crisis.

Cyclone Yaku brought extreme rainfall conditions to the departments of Tumbes, Piura, and Lambayeque. On 8 March, rainfall was reported in the departments of Tumbes, Piura, Lambayeque, La Libertad, Ancash, and Lima. On 10 March,  La Leche River overflows in the Lambayeque Province, affecting the district of Illimo, leaving 3,000 homeless and leaving over 1,000 homes uninhabitable.. In the department of La Libertad, there was flooding in the provinces of Chepén and Pacasmayo after torrential rains. SENAMHI reports indicated that the departments of Lambayeque and La Libertad exceeded the historical record of rainfall accumulation in 24 hours, reporting values not recorded since the 1997–98 and 2017 El Niño events.

By 14 March, dozens of huaicos were reported throughout the nation as a result of the rainfall. Huiacos were reported in the Lima Province, with mudslides reported in Ancón, Carabayllo, Chaclacayo, Cieneguilla, Comas and Punta Hermosa. In Punta Hermosa, widespread flooding was reported. The Piura River surpassed its crest in the urban area of Piura, resulting in flooding. The town of Quiruvilca was completely destroyed by landslides. Residents of Illimo, who faced flooding since 10 March, reported that despite much of the city being flooded, no response was provided and that they had not received drinking water for nearly five days. PerúSAT-1 collected images of Cyclone Yaku's impact in an effort to respond to the system's effect.  In the early morning hours of 15 March, some residents of Lurigancho-Chosica were evacuated due to the risk of huaicos. 

At least 60% of homes in Catacaos were abandoned due to the risks of the Piura River overflowing. CEPRENED estimated that 592 districts along Peru are at risk of landslides or mudslides due to heavy rains. President Dina Boluarte flew over the flooded areas after the heavy rains that affected in Lambayeque. The government of Dina Boluarte received criticism from international media and television celebrities, who claimed that it had zero or a slow response to the natural disasters that hit the country.

Ecuador
Heavy rainfall occurred across at least 37 cantons in Ecuador. Milagro, and Yaguachi. El Triunfo experienced flooding, while the cyclone damaged residences in Quevedo and Los Ríos. Concerns of a leptospirosis outbreak followed 50 infections. Many areas in Guayaquil received heavy rainfall. Roads flooded as a result of these precipitations, and the electrical system was impacted.

See also

Weather of 2023
Climate of Peru
Climate of Ecuador
Subtropical Cyclone Katie
Subtropical Cyclone Lexi
Subtropical Cyclone Humberto
List of South America hurricanes

References

Yaku
March 2023 events in Ecuador
March 2023 events in Peru
Yaku
Yaku